John Daniel Nuttall (born 29 December 1967) is an English former first-class cricketer.

Nuttall was born at Fulford in the North Riding of Yorkshire in December 1967. He later studied at St Peter's College, Oxford where he played first-class cricket for Oxford University. He made his debut in first-class cricket against Kent at Oxford in 1987. He played first-class cricket for Oxford until 1989, making nine appearances. In his nine matches, he scored 77 runs with a high score of 35. With his left-arm medium pace bowling, he took 12 wickets at an average of 61.08 and best figures of 2 for 64. He later played in the Lancashire League, before transferring to the Bolton Cricket League as a professional in 1995.

References

External links

1967 births
Living people
Cricketers from York
Alumni of St Peter's College, Oxford
English cricketers
Oxford University cricketers